The Koderma–Hazaribagh–Barkakana–Ranchi line is an Indian railway line connecting  in the Asansol–Gaya section with ,  and . This  track is under the jurisdiction of South Eastern Railway and East Central Railway.

History
This line was announced in rail budget 1999 under the rule of Atal Bihari Vajpayee. The Koderma–Hazaribagh Town section was completed on 20 February 2015. It was inaugurated by Prime Minister Narendra Modi along with Jharkhand Governor Syed Ahmad, Chief Minister Raghubar Das, Union Railways Minister Suresh Prabhu, Union Minister of State for Railways Manoj Sinha, Union Minister of State for Finance and Hazaribagh MP Jayant Sinha.

The 57 km-long Hazaribagh Town–Barkakana section  was opened for passenger trains on 7 December 2016 by Railway Minister Suresh Prabhu in the presence of Chief Minister Raghubar Das.

Work is in progress on the Barkakana–Ranchi sector. The state government is bearing half of the project cost. As the line passes through a coal mining belt it will carry a lot of coal, in addition to passenger traffic.

Special passenger train service started on 31 March 2017 from Barkakana Junction to Sidhwar station of Barkakana–Ranchi new line section.

Trial run of passenger train between Tatisilwai and Shanki railway station (31.4 km) of Ranchi Barkakana new rail line done on 17 January 2018.

New Railway line between Tatisilwai and Sanki was inaugurated by CM Ragubar Das on 29 August 2019. Two new pairs of passenger trains between Hatia and Sanki station started on 29 August 2019.

Branch line
The Tori–Shivpur–Kathuatia line connecting the Hazaribagh–Kodarma line, was planned in 1998 to speed up coal evacuation in the North Karanpura Coalfield. Currently the Tori–Shivpur sector is operationalised with work in the Shivpoor–Kathutia sector under progress.

References

|

5 ft 6 in gauge railways in India
Rail transport in West Bengal
Rail transport in Jharkhand

Transport in Asansol
Transport in Jamshedpur
Transport in Kharagpur